Lucius Autronius Paetus (fl. 1st century BC) was a Roman senator who was appointed suffect consul in 33 BC.

Biography
Autronius Paetus was the son of Publius Autronius Paetus, who had been elected Roman consul for 65 BC, but was convicted of electoral fraud prior to entering office. A supporter of Octavianus, he was appointed suffect consul on 1 January 33 BC, replacing Octavianus on his first day as consul. Then in 29/28 BC, he was appointed the proconsular governor of Africa, during which time he was acclaimed imperator by his troops, for which he celebrated a triumph in 28 BC.

Sources
Broughton, T. Robert S., The Magistrates of the Roman Republic, Vol II (1952)
 Broughton, T. Robert S., The Magistrates of the Roman Republic, Vol III (1986)
Syme, Ronald, "The Augustan Aristocracy" (1986) . Clarendon Press.

References

1st-century BC Roman consuls
Senators of the Roman Republic
Roman governors of Africa
Paetus, Lucius
Year of birth unknown
Year of death unknown